Mohamed Sohel Rana may refer to:
 Mohamed Sohel Rana (footballer, born 1991)
 Mohamed Sohel Rana (footballer, born 1996)
 Sohel Rana (footballer, born 1995)
 Sohel Rana (businessman), Bangladeshi businessman and politician